Lesbian, gay, bisexual, and transgender (LGBTQIA+) rights in Kazakhstan are considered the most developed in Central Asia. However, like in other Post-Soviet countries, LGBT people face legal challenges not experienced by non-LGBTQIA+ citizens. Both male and female same-sex sexual activity are legal in Kazakhstan, but same-sex couples and households headed by same-sex couples are not eligible for the same legal protections available to opposite-sex married couples.

Since the Dissolution of the Soviet Union, Kazakhstan decriminalised both male and female same-sex sexual activity in late 1997 de facto (since 1998 de jure) and the age of consent was equalised to that of heterosexual activity in late 1997 de facto (since 1998 de jure). Transgender people have been allowed to legally change their gender since 2003. LGBT people are also allowed to serve in the military since 2022. Multiple LGBT groups have emerged over the years. There are small gay communities in Astana, Aktobe, Almaty, Karaganda, Kostanay, Pavlodar, Petropavl and Oskemen. However, much like in other Central Asian countries, lesbian, gay, bisexual and transgender (LGBT) rights in Kazakhstan remain severely limited and homosexuality remains highly stigmatised in Kazakhstan society, with no LGBTQ NGOs, strong overtones of official intolerance and no equal rights on the basis of sexual orientation in areas such as employment, education, media, and the provision of goods and services, amongst others.

In the 2011 UN General Assembly declaration for LGBT rights, Kazakhstan was the only European country that expressed its opposition on the topic. The influence of Islam and socially conservative attitudes against gay and lesbian men and women remain firmly entrenched throughout the country. Many people in Kazakhstan believe that homosexuality is a behavioural disorder, and many LGBT persons in Kazakhstan tend to hide their sexual orientation in public. Those who are "out" face harassment, violence and physical abuse.

History 
Genghis Khan banned homosexual acts in the Mongol Empire and made them punishable by death.

LGBT history in Kazakhstan has been marked by periods of both tolerance and persecution and dates back to the early 20th century, when homosexuality was first decriminalised in 1917 following the October Revolution, which established the Soviet Union. 

The Bolshevik government was influenced by the ideas of Magnus Hirschfeld, a German scientist who argued that homosexuality was a natural manifestation of human sexuality. However, in 1933 the Soviet Union re-criminalized homosexuality as part of a broader campaign against "deviant" behaviour. Discrimination against LGBT individuals persisted in the Soviet era, and homosexuality was not officially declassified as a mental illness until 16 July 1997 de facto, since 1998 de jure.

Legality of same-sex sexual activity

Decriminalisation process
Both male and female same-sex sexual activity have been legal in Kazakhstan since late 1997, when under the revised criminal code same-sex relations between consenting adults was no longer a criminal offence. 
Prior to 1997, Article 104 of the Penal Code of Kazakhstan used to criminalise "buggery". This legislation followed the corresponding Section 121 from the former Soviet Union, which only specifically criminalised anal intercourse between men. In late 1997 the law was repealed and replaced with a common age of consent for all sexual activity of 16 years. Lesbianism was never a criminal offence. In 1998, consensual sex between same-sex couples became lawful. There are currently no provisions in the Constitution of Kazakhstan that criminalise any aspect of same-sex sexual relations.

Gender identity and expression

Since 2003, transgender individuals have been allowed to change their legal gender on their official identity documents in Kazakhstan. People who wanted to change their gender had to receive a diagnosis of "gender identity disorder" involving several medical tests and a 30-day psychiatric evaluation. 

In 2011, new guidelines were established and allowed change to identity documents only after sex reassignment surgery, physical and psychiatric medical examinations, hormone therapy and sterilization. Additionally, people under 21 are not allowed to change their gender on their official identity documents.

Recognition of same-sex relationships
Kazakhstan does not recognise same-sex marriage or civil unions.

Adoption and parenting

As of 2023, same-sex couples could not legally adopt children in Kazakhstan.

Discrimination protections
The violence and discrimination against LGBT people in Kazakhstan are fairly common and often not reported to the police. No laws exist yet in Kazakhstan that protect LGBT people from discrimination in employment, education, housing, health care, public accommodations or credit.

Blood donation
There are no restrictions on gay and bisexual men from donating blood by the Government of Kazakhstan.

Military service
On 14 June 2012, Defense Minister Adilbek Zhaksybekov was reported to have declared that gay men are not welcome in the nation’s military, saying that they are exempt because they have ‘a disorder of sexual desire’.

Since 2022, lesbians, gays, and bisexuals are allowed to serve openly in the military. The ministry of Defense of the Republic of Kazakhstan in 2022, said in an interview that no one is banned from serving in the military because of their sexual orientation.

Freedom of speech and expression

On 26 May 2015, the Constitutional Council of Kazakhstan declared a pending bill, which would have banned the "propaganda of nontraditional sexual orientation", unconstitutional. The council rejected it because of its vague wording. The bill passed the Senate, Parliament's upper house, in February 2015 and was sent to President Nursultan Nazarbayev for signature. It had already been approved by the lower house. Human Rights Watch said: "By rejecting this propaganda bill, Kazakhstan’s Constitutional Council set an important precedent against the adoption of discriminatory legislation."

In September 2019, the Supreme Court ruled in a landmark case that two women would receive compensation from a Facebook user who posted a video showing them kissing without their permission. The video solicited a large number of homophobic and murderous comments, and was viewed 60,000 times in a day before being taken down by the user. Human Rights Watch hailed the ruling as a milestone for privacy rights.

Public opinion
In May 2015, PlanetRomeo, an LGBT social network, published its first Gay Happiness Index (GHI). Gay men from over 120 countries were asked about how they feel about society's view on homosexuality, how do they experience the way they are treated by other people and how satisfied are they with their lives. Kazakhstan was ranked 118th, just above Ghana and below Burkina Faso, with a GHI score of 29.

According to a June 2015-June 2016 survey by the Pew Research Center, 89% of people in Kazakhstan opposed same-sex marriage, with only 7% supporting it.

LGBT rights movement

Online communities and news portals, sorted by founding date, descending
 2015: Femenita  is a grassroots, queer-feminist activist group working on advancement of LBQ women’s rights and freedoms and dignified life on the basis of systematic feedback loop from the communities in Kazakhstan.
 2017: Kot.team, the first LGBT mass media in Kazakhstan   
 2018: AmanBol   is the first HIV self-testing program in Central Asia, dedicated to providing service for MSM and transgender persons in Kazakhstan.

Living conditions
LGBT people in Kazakhstan face discrimination and prejudice on the grounds of their sexual orientation or gender identity during the course of their everyday lives. Manifestation of negative attitudes toward LGBT people, such as social exclusion, taunting, and violence, often cause the victims physical, psychological and emotional harm. In order to avoid the dangers posed by people who do not approve of non-heterosexual sexual orientations, many LGBT people feel compelled to keep their sexual orientation or gender identity a secret from almost all people in their lives. The majority regard it as necessary to conceal their sexual orientation or gender identity from people in the workplace in order to retain their jobs and avoid hostility from bosses and co-workers. Attempts to report homophobic and transphobic violence to police are often met with resistance and even hostility on the part of law enforcement officers.

A 2011 cross-national study by the University of Chicago demonstrated that a growing trend of LGBT acceptance was either slowed or reversed in Russia and some other former USSR republics, a direct opposite of world trends.

Statistics
According to a 2018 survey, conducted by the Republican Centre for AIDS Prevention and Control and the Kazakh Ministry of Health, there were about 62,000 men who have sex with men in Kazakhstan; about 6,000 in Almaty, 3,300 in Astana, and 4,900 in Karaganda Region. This number, however, is expected to be much higher, due to societal homophobia which may prevent individuals from coming out.

United Nations
Kazakhstan has opposed landmark LGBT reforms at the United Nations. In 2011, it opposed the "joint statement on ending acts of violence and related human rights violations based on sexual orientation and gender identity" at the United Nations.

Notable individuals

 Abdel Mukhtarov, singer and LGBT rights activist
 Adil Liyan, producer/journalist 
 Altynai Kambekova, LGBT rights activist
 Anatoly Chernousov, LGBT rights activist
 Amir Shaikezhanov, LGBT rights activist
 Binazir Ermaganbetova, humour blogger/singer
 Daniyar Sabitov, LGBT rights activist
 Farema Kazakpayeva, singer
 Gasan Akhmedov, LGBT rights activist
 Gulzada Serzhan, LGBT rights activist
 Natasha Maximova, the Kazakh-born first transgender woman on a magazine cover in Russia.
 Ninety One, Q-pop boy band
 Nurbibi Nurkadilova, LGBT rights activist and Zamanbek Nurkadilov's granddaughter
 Nurlan Alimkhodzhaev, visagiste
 Zarina Baibolova, stand-up comedian
 Yan Ray, fashion photographer
 Zhanar Sekerbayeva, LGBT rights activist
 Ziruza, Q-pop singer/songwriter

Summary table

See also

LGBT rights in Europe
LGBT rights in Asia
Politics of Kazakhstan
Human rights in Kazakhstan
Recognition of same-sex unions in Europe
Homosexuality and Islam
LGBT rights by country or territory
Transgender people and religion
Think of the children

References

External links

 , LGBT online media publication
  LGBT organization from Oskemen
 

Kazakhstan
Kazakhstan
LGBT in Kazakhstan
Political movements in Kazakhstan